= Iran Martial Arts professionals Union =

Non-governmental organization

- Sport: Martial Arts
- Jurisdiction: Iran
- Founded: 2004
- President: Ali Haghshenas
- Other key staff: Deputies

Official website
- impunion.blogfa.com
- (Iran)

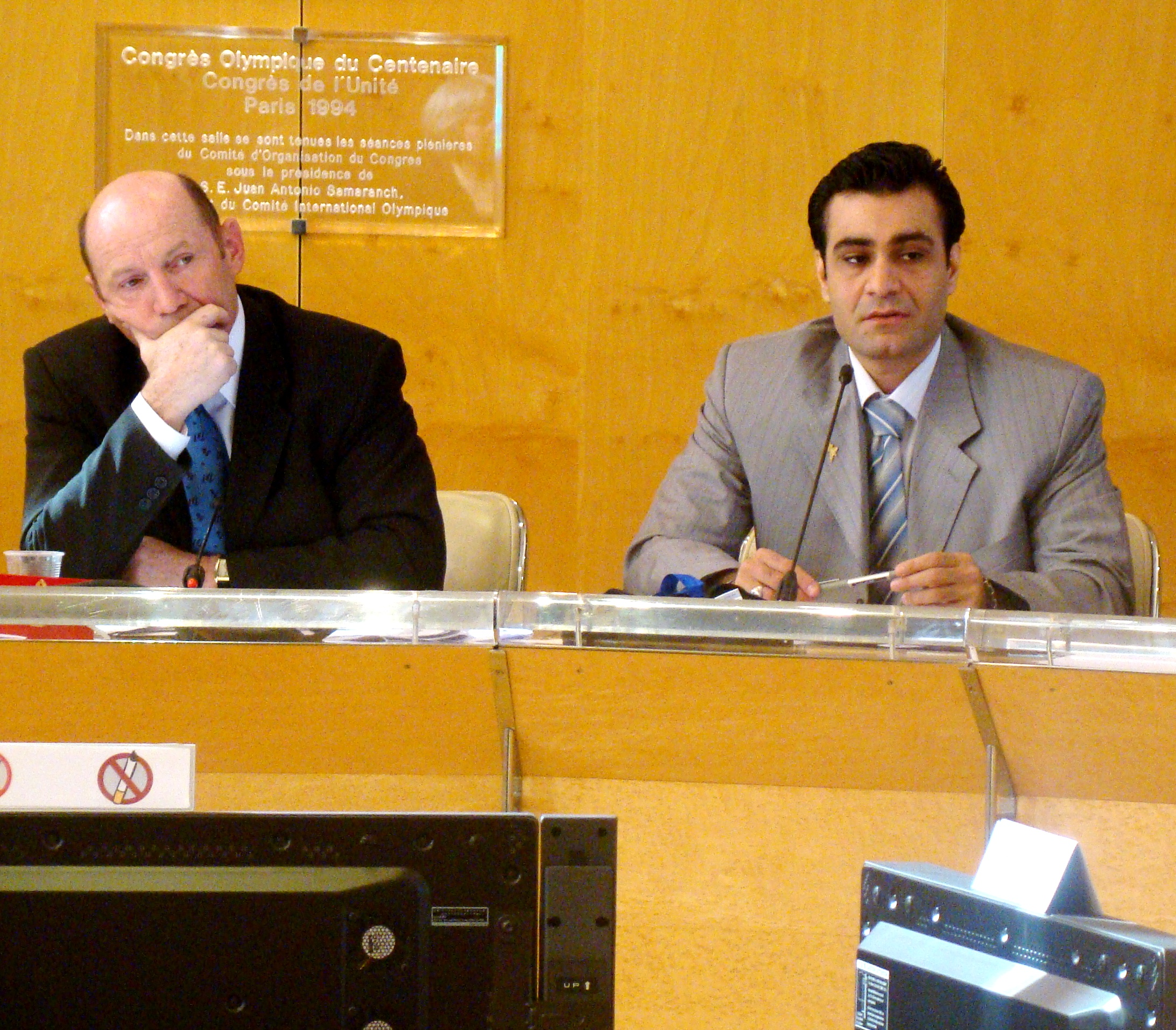
Ali Haghshenas (right)

The Iran Martial Arts professionals Union, is the second non-governmental sports federation of Iran that was established in 2004.

This union is a civil, non-profit, independent and sports institution that is involved in holding various coaching and refereeing courses – holding domestic and international competitions – sending selected teams to overseas competitions – launching and covering different styles of martial arts and publishing sports books.

Ali Haghshenas is the founder and chairman of this organization.

== Government oppositions ==
The Iran Physical Education Organization - Ministry of Sport, are two organizations which are opposed the activities of the I.M.P.U.

These oppositions were more intense during the presidency of Mahmoud Ahmadinejad.

Iran Martial Arts professionals Union, is a founding member of the Iran Sport Non-governmental organizations Society.

=== A letter to the Minister of Sports and criticizing the use of martial arts in suppressing people ===
In a letter to Seyed Hamid Sajjadi, the Minister of Iran Sports and Youth, on 14 October 2022, Ali Haqshanas, the head of the Union, criticized his words regarding the use of martial sports to suppress Iran's Mahsa Amini protests.

== Scientific activities ==
Among the scientific activities of the Union, the following can be mentioned:

Writing and publishing of Scientific, Reference and Academic Books:

- The Martial Arts Encyclopedia: The First Martial Arts Encyclopedia in Iran, By: Ali Haghshenas (The President of I.M.P.U), Published in 2016, Iran, Tehran (The Fifth Edition −2023).
- The TopTaekwondo Doctrine: Taekwondo free style of the world, By: Ali Haghshenas (The President of I.M.P.U), Published in 2020, Iran, Tehran (The Third Edition −2023),
- The Pathology of Martial Arts: The First Persian Source of Pathology of Martial Arts, By: Ali Haghshenas (The President of I.M.P.U), Published in 2022, Iran, Tehran (The Second Edition −2023)
- Taekwondo Physiology: The First Taekwondo Physiology Reference Book in Iran, By: Ali Haghshenas (The President of I.M.P.U), Published in 2022, Iran, Tehran (The Second Edition −2023).
- The Role of the Coach in Taekwondo From the Base to the National Teams, By: Ali Haghshenas (The President of I.M.P.U), Published in 2023, Iran, Tehran.
- The Philosophy of Oriental Martial Arts (Okinawa, Wushu, Judo and Taekwondo), By: Ali Haghshenas (The President of I.M.P.U), Published in 2023, Iran, Tehran.
- The Self Defense Methods in Street Fighting, By: Ali Haghshenas (The President of I.M.P.U), Published in 2023, Iran, Tehran.
- Principles of Advanced Judging in Taekwondo, (Kyurogi, Para and Poomsae), By: Ali Haghshenas (The President of I.M.P.U), Published in 2024, Iran, Tehran.
- Savate (French Boxing) and It’s Fighting Principles, By: Hamidreza Tavakoul Shoar (The Vice President I.M.P.U), Published in 2012, Iran, Tehran.
- The Savate Encyclopedia (French Boxing) with dates back six decades in Iran, By: Hamidreza Tavakoul Shoar (The Vice President I.M.P.U), Published in 2015, Iran, Tehran.
- The Martial Arts & Its Graet Founders, By: Hamidreza Tavakoul Shoar (The Vice President I.M.P.U), Published in 2015, Iran, Tehran, (The Fifth Edition – 2018).
- The Tang Soo Do, Kuk Sool Won and Hapkido, By: Mehran Khalili Manesh (GS of the I.M.P.U), Published in 2022, Iran, Tehran.
- Self-defense training in hand-to-hand combat, By: Mehran Khalili Manesh (GS of the I.M.P.U), Published in 2022, Iran, Tehran.
- Sixty years of Savate in Iran, By: Javad Moshiri (The Deputy Manager of I.M.P.U), Published in 2020, Iran, Tehran, (The Third Edition – 2023)
- The TopTaekwondo, Kickboxing and Muay Thai, By: Javad Moshiri (The Deputy Manager of I.M.P.U), Published in 2022, Iran, Tehran.
- Philosophy of Taekwondo, karate and Kang Fu, By: Javad Moshiri (The Deputy Manager of I.M.P.U), Published in 2023, Iran, Tehran.
